The Brihadaranyaka Upanishad  is one of the Principal Upanishads and one of the first Upanishadic scriptures of Hinduism. A key scripture to various schools of Hinduism, the Brihadaranyaka Upanisad is tenth in the Muktikā or "canon of 108 Upanishads".

The Brihadaranyaka Upanishad is estimated to have been composed about 7th-6th century BCE, excluding some parts estimated to have been composed after the Chandogya Upanishad. The Sanskrit language text is contained within the Shatapatha Brahmana, which is itself a part of the Shukla Yajur Veda.

The Brihadaranyaka Upanishad is a treatise on Ātman (Self), includes passages on metaphysics, ethics and a yearning for knowledge that influenced various Indian religions, ancient and medieval scholars, and attracted secondary works such as those by Adi Shankara and Madhvacharya.

Chronology
The chronology of Brihadaranyaka Upanishad, like other Upanishads, is uncertain and contested. The chronology is difficult to resolve because all opinions rest on scanty evidence, an analysis of archaism, style and repetitions across texts, driven by assumptions about likely evolution of ideas, and on presumptions about which philosophy might have influenced which other Indian philosophies. Patrick Olivelle states, "in spite of claims made by some, in reality, any dating of these documents (early Upanishads) that attempts a precision closer than a few centuries is as stable as a house of cards".

The chronology and authorship of Brihadaranyaka Upanishad, along with Chandogya and Kaushitaki Upanishads, is further complicated because they are compiled anthologies of literature that must have existed as independent texts before they became part of these Upanishads.

The exact year, and even the century of the Upanishad composition is unknown. Scholars have offered different estimates ranging from 900 BCE to 600 BCE, all preceding Buddhism. Brihadaranyaka is one of the first Upanishads, along with that of Jaiminiya Upanishad and Chandogya Upanishads. The Brihadaranyaka Upanishad was in all likelihood composed in the earlier part of 1st millennium BCE, in the 7th-6th century BCE, give or take a century or so, according to Patrick Olivelle. It is likely that the text was a living document and some verses were edited over a period of time before the 6th century BCE.

Etymology and structure

Brihadaranyaka literally means "great wilderness or forest". The Brihadaranyaka Upanishad is credited to ancient sage Yajnavalkya, but likely refined by a number of ancient Vedic scholars. The Upanishad forms the last part, that is the fourteenth kānda of Śatapatha Brāhmana of "Śhukla Yajurveda". The Brihadaranyaka Upanishad has six adhyayas (chapters) in total. There are two major recensions for the text - the Madhyandina and the Kanva recensions. It includes three sections: Madhu kānda (the 4th and 5th chapter of the fourteenth kānda of Satapatha Brahmana), Muni kānda (or Yajnavalkya Kanda, the 6th and 7th chapter of 14th kānda of Satapatha Brahmana) and Khila kānda (the 8th and 9th chapter of the fourteenth kānda of Satapatha Brahmana).

The first and second chapters of the Upanishad's Madhu kānda consists of six brahmanas each, with varying number of hymns per brahmana. The first chapter of the Upanishad's Yajnavalkya kānda consists of nine brahmanams, while the second has six brahmanas. The Khila kānda of the Upanishad has fifteen brahmanas in its first chapter, and five brahmanas in the second chapter.

Content

First chapter
The Brihadaranyaka Upanishad starts by stating one of many Vedic theories of creation of the universe. It asserts that there was nothing before the universe started, then Prajapati created from this nothing the universe as a sacrifice to himself, imbued it with Prana (life force) to preserve it in the form of cosmic inert matter and individual psychic energy. The world is more than matter and energy, asserts Brihadaranyaka, it is constituted also of Atman or Brahman (Self, Consciousness, Invisible Principles and Reality) as well as Knowledge.

The Brahmana 4 in the first chapter, announces the non-dual, monistic metaphysical premise that Atman and Brahman are identical Oneness, with the assertion that because the universe came out of nothingness when the only principle existent was "I am he", the universe after it came into existence continues as Aham brahma asmi (I am Brahman). In the last brahmana of the first chapter, the Upanishad explains that the Atman (Self) inspires by being self-evident (name identity), through empowering forms, and through action (work of a living being). The Self, states Brihadaranyaka, is the imperishable one that is invisible and concealed pervading all reality.

Second chapter
The Brihadaranyaka Upanishad starts the second chapter as a conversation between Ajatashatru and Balaki Gargya on theory of dreams, positing that human beings see dreams entirely unto themselves because mind draws, in itself, the powers of sensory organs, which it releases in the waking state. It then asserts that this empirical fact about dreams suggests that human mind has the power to perceive the world as it is, as well as fabricate the world as it wants to perceive it. Mind is a means, prone to flaws. The struggle man faces, asserts Brihadaranyaka in brahmana 3, is in his attempt to realize the "true reality behind perceived reality". That is Atman-Brahman, inherently and blissfully existent, yet unknowable because it has no qualities, no characteristics, it is "neti, neti" (literally, "not this, not this").

In fourth brahmana, the Upanishad presents a dialogue between a husband and wife, as Yajnavalkya and Maitreyi, on nature of love and spirituality, whether and how is Atman related to deep connection and bonds between human beings. Yajnavalkya states that one doesn't connect with and love forms, nor does one connect or love mind, rather one connects with the Self, the Self of one's own and one's beloved. All love is for the sake of one's Self, and the Oneness one realizes in the Self of the beloved. He then asserts that this knowledge of the Self, the Self, the Brahman is what makes one immortal, the connection immortal. All longing is the longing for the Self, because Self is the true, the immortal, the real and the infinite bliss.

The fifth brahmana of the second chapter introduces the Madhu theory, thus giving this section of the Upanishad the ancient name Madhu Khanda. The Madhu theory is one of the foundational principles of Vedanta schools of Hinduism, as well as other āstika schools of Indian philosophies. Madhu literally means "honey", or the composite fruit of numerous actions on the field of flowers. In the Madhu theory, notes Paul Deussen, the Brihadaranyaka Upanishad asserts that "Atman exists" (Self exists), that all organic beings (plants, animals, human beings and gods) are wandering Selfs yet One with each other and the Brahman (Cosmic Self); it further asserts that inorganic nature (fire, air, earth, water, space) is the field where the beings act, and where their numerous actions create fruits that they separately and together experience. The Upanishad then states that everything is connected, beings affect each other, organic beings affect the inorganic nature, inorganic nature affects the organic beings, one is the "honey" (result, fruit, food) of the other, everyone and everything is mutually dependent, nourishing and nurturing each other, all because it came from one Brahman, because it is all one Brahman, because all existence is blissful oneness. This theory appears in various early and middle Upanishads, and parallels Immanuel Kant's doctrine of "the affinity of phenomena" built on "the synthetic unity of apperception".

The last brahmanam of the Upanishad's first section is a Vamsa (generational line of teachers) with the names of 57 Vedic scholars who are credited to have taught the Madhu Khanda from one generation to the next.

Third chapter
The third chapter is a metaphysical dialogue between ten ancient sages, on the nature of Reality, Atman and Mukti. Paul Deussen calls the presentation of ancient scholar Yajnavalkya in this chapter "not dissimilar to that of Socrates in the dialogues of Plato". Among other things, the chapter presents the theory of perceived empirical knowledge using the concepts of graha and atigraha (sensory action and sense). It lists 8 combinations of graha and atigraha: breath and smell, speech and name (ideas), tongue and taste, eye and form, ear and sound, skin and touch, mind and desire, arms and work respectively. The sages debate the nature of death, asserts the third chapter of Brihadaranyaka Upanishad, and whether any graha and atigraha prevails after one dies. They rule out six, then assert that one's ideas (name) and one's actions and work (karma) continues to affect the universe.

The fourth brahmana of the third chapter asserts, "it is your Self which is inside all", all Selfs are one, immanent and transcendent. The fifth brahmana states that profound knowledge requires that one give up showing off one's erudition, then adopt childlike curiosity and simplicity, followed by becoming silent, meditating and observant (muni), thus beginning the journey towards profound knowledge, understanding the Self of things where there is freedom from frustration and sorrow. In the sixth and eighth brahmana of the third chapter in Brihad Aranyaka Upanishad is the dialogue between Gargi Vachaknavi – the female Vedic sage, and Yajñavalka, on the nature of universe.

The seventh brahmana discusses how and why the Self interconnects and has the oneness through all organic beings, all inorganic nature, all of the universe. It asserts that the Self is the inner controller of beings, conflated with the interaction of nature, psyche, and senses, often without the knowledge of beings. It is the Self, nevertheless, that is the true and essence, states the Upanishad. The ninth brahmana, the longest of the third chapter, introduces the "neti, neti" principle that is discussed later, along with the analogical equivalence of physical features of a man and those of a tree, with the root of a man being his Self. The last hymns of chapter 3 in Brihadaranyaka Upanishad also attest to the prevalent practice of the renouncing ascetic life by the time Brihadaranyaka Upanishad was composed in Vedic age of India, and it is these ascetic circles that are credited for major movements such as Yoga as well as the śramaṇa traditions later to be called Buddhism, Jainism and heterodox Hinduism.

Fourth chapter
The fourth chapter of Brihadaranyaka Upanishad starts as a dialogue between King Janaka and Yajnavalka. It explores various aspects of the "Self exists" theory, its phenomenal manifestations, and its philosophical implications on soteriology. The Upanishad, in the first brahmanam of fourth chapter, states that the Self manifests in human life in six forms: Prajna (consciousness), Priyam (love and the will to live), Satyam (reverence for truth, reality), Ananta (endlessness, curiosity for the eternal), Ananda (bliss, contentness), and Sthiti (the state of enduring steadfastness, calm perseverance).

In the second brahmanam, the Upanishad explores the question, "what happens to Self after one dies?", and provides the root of two themes that play central role in later schools of Hinduism: one, of the concept of Self as individual Selfs (dualism), and second of the concept of Self being One and Eternal neither comes nor goes anywhere, because it is everywhere and everyone in Oneness (non-dualism). This chapter discusses the widely cited "neti, neti" (नेति नेति, "not this, not this") principle towards one's journey to understanding Self. The second brahmanam concludes that Self exists is self-evident, Self is blissfully free, Self is eternally invulnerable, and Self is indescribable knowledge.

The hymn 4.2.4 of Brihadaranyaka Upanishad is one of many instances in the ancient Sanskrit text where the characters involved in philosophical debate greet each other with Namaste (नमस्ते), a practice in the culture of India.

The third brahmanam of the fourth chapter discusses the premises of moksha (liberation, freedom, emancipation, self-realization), and provides some of the most studied hymns of Brihadaranyaka. Paul Deussen calls it, "unique in its richness and warmth of presentation", with profoundness that retains its full worth in modern times. It translates as follows,

The fourth brahmanam continues to build the thematic description of Atman-Brahman (Self) and the state of self-realization as achieved. Yajnavalkya declares that Knowledge is Self, Knowledge is freedom, Knowledge powers inner peace. In hymn 4.4.22, the Upanishad states, "He is that great unborn Self, who consists of Knowledge, is surrounded by the Prânas (life-force), the ether within the heart. In it [Self] there reposes the ruler of all, the lord of all, the king of all. He does not become greater by good works, nor smaller by evil works. He is the lord of all, the king of all things, the protector of all things. He is a bank and a boundary, so that these worlds may not be confounded. He who knows him [Self], becomes a Muni. Wishing for that world, mendicants leave their homes."

Max Müller and Paul Deussen, in their respective translations, describe the Upanishad's view of "Self" and "free, liberated state of existence" as, "[Self] is imperishable, for he cannot perish; he is unattached, for he does not attach himself; unfettered, he does not suffer, he does not fail. He is beyond good and evil, and neither what he has done, nor what he has omitted to do, affects him. (...) He therefore who knows it [reached self-realization], becomes quiet, subdued, satisfied, patient, and collected. He sees self in Self, sees all as Self. Evil does not overcome him, he overcomes all evil. Evil does not burn him, he burns all evil. Free from evil, free from spots, free from doubt, he became Atman-Brâhmana; this is the Brahma-world, O King, thus spoke Yagnavalkya."

The last brahmanam of the Upanishad's second section is another Vamsa (generational line of teachers) with the names of 59 Vedic scholars who are credited to have taught the hymns of Muni Khanda from one generation to the next, before it became part of Brihadaranyaka.

Fifth and sixth chapters
The fifth and sixth chapters of Brihadaranyaka Upanishad are known as Khila Khanda, which literally means "supplementary section, or appendix". Each brahmanam in the supplement is small except the fourteenth. This section, suggests Paul Deussen, was likely written later to clarify and add ideas considered important in that later age.

Some brahmanams in the last section of Brihadaranyaka Upanishad, such as the second and third brahmanam in fifth chapter, append ethical theories, while fourth brahmanam in the fifth chapter asserts that "empirical reality and truth is Brahman". In the fourth brahmanam of sixth chapter, sexual rituals between a husband and wife are described to conceive and celebrate the birth of a child.

Teachings

The Bṛhadāraṇyaka Upaniṣad has been an important work in Vedanta and it discusses many early concepts and theories foundational to Hinduism such as karma, Atman-Brahman, the afterlife, etc.

Creation 
The Bṛhadāraṇyaka contains various passages which discuss the beginning of the universe and its creation. A key figure in this process is the deity Prajapati, who creates the world through liturgical recitation, priestly sacrifice, dividing up his own body, copulation, giving birth to various devas and demons. 

One passage on the creation states: "in the beginning this world was just a single body (atman) shaped like a man. He looked around and saw nothing but himself." The Bṛhadāraṇyaka goes on to state that this single body became afraid and wanted to have a companion, so he split his body into two, made a wife and copulated with her to create all living beings.

Atman 
The Bṛhadāraṇyaka Upaniṣad teaches the theory of atman (the Self), which is the eternal inner reality in a person. It is described by the Bṛhadāraṇyaka as follows:This innermost thing, this self (atman)—it is dearer than a son, it is dearer than wealth, it is dearer than everything else...a man should regard only his self as dear to him. When a man regards only his self as dear to him, what he holds dear will never perish.This self is also the source of all vital functions:As a spider sends forth its thread, and as tiny sparks spring forth from a fire, so indeed do all the vital functions (prana), all the worlds, all the gods, and all beings spring from this self (atman). Its hidden name (upanisad) is 'The real behind the real,' for the real consists of the vital functions, and the self is the real behind the vital functions.According to the Bṛhadāraṇyaka, this self travels through various worlds and takes up a body:It is this person—the one that consists of perception among the vital functions (prana), the one that is the inner light within the heart. He travels across both worlds, being common to both. Sometimes he reflects, sometimes he flutters, for when he falls asleep he transcends this world, these visible forms of death. When at birth this person takes on a body, he becomes united with bad things, and when at death he leaves it behind, he gets rid of those bad things.However, this self is not just something individual, since the Bṛhadāraṇyaka states:When a chunk of salt is thrown in water, it dissolves into that very water, and it cannot be picked up in any way. Yet, from whichever place one may take a sip, the salt is there! In the same way this Immense Being has no limit or boundary and is a single mass of perception.Furthermore, this self which is an imperishable reality and the "radiant and immortal person" in all things, cannot be grasped:About this self (atman), one can only say 'not—, not—' (neti neti). He is ungraspable, for he cannot be grasped. He is undecaying, for he is not subject to decay. He has nothing sticking to him, for he does not stick to anything. He is not bound; yet he neither trembles in fear nor suffers injury. And yet, its only by reflecting on one's atman that one can gain knowledge:You see, Maitreyi—it is one's self (atman) which one should see and hear, and on which one should reflect and concentrate. For by seeing and hearing one's self, and by reflecting and concentrating on one's self, one gains the knowledge of this whole world.

Brahman and atman 
Another term found in the Bṛhadāraṇyaka is Brahman, and this is closely associated with the term atman. According to the Bṛhadāraṇyaka, "in the beginning this world was only brahman, only one." Then Brahman, which was "not fully developed", created the "ruling power" among the gods and then it also created all the castes (brahmin, ksatriya, vaisya and shudra) as well Dharma.

According to the Bṛhadāraṇyaka there are "two visible appearances (rupa) of brahman":

 One form has a fixed shape, is mortal, stationary, this refers to the body as well as things in the external world
 the form other is without a fixed shape, is immortal and in motion. It also refers to "the person within the sun's orb" as well as to "breath and the space within the body". Furthermore, "the visible appearance of this person is like a golden cloth, or white wool, or a red bug, or a flame, or a white lotus, or a sudden flash of lightning."
The Bṛhadāraṇyaka also equates the world and Brahman with fullness and space (akasha):The world there is full; the world here is full; dullness from fullness proceeds. After taking fully from the full, it still remains completely full. Brahman is space. The primeval one is space. Space is windy.
According to the Bṛhadāraṇyaka, the atman is none other than Brahman itself, the ultimate truth and creative principle of the universe:This self (atman) is the honey of all beings, and all beings are the honey of this self. The radiant and immortal person in the self and the radiant and immortal person connected with the body (atman)—they are both one's self. It is the immortal; it is brahman; it is the Whole. This very self (atman) is the lord and king of all beings. As all the spokes are fastened to the hub and the rim of a wheel, so to one's self (atman) are fastened all beings, all the gods, all the worlds, all the breaths, and all these bodies (atman).Yajñavalkya also explains the Brahman with the phrase "the self within all is this self of yours," and this is said to be "the one who is beyond hunger and thirst, sorrow and delusion, old age and death." He also calls the Brahman-atman the "inner controller, the immortal" which is present in earth, water (and other elements) but is different from them and controls them from within. This self "sees, but he can't be seen; he hears, but he can't be heard; he thinks, but he can't be thought of; he perceives, but he can't be perceived." 

The Bṛhadāraṇyaka also describes "the highest Brahman" as "the heart," which is "the abode of all beings" and "the foundation of all beings." This brahman in the space of the heart is said to be "the controller of all, the lord of all, the ruler of all," and is not affected or changed by karma (action). 

This brahman in the heart, also called Prajapati, is also described in the Bṛhadāraṇyaka as follows:This person here is made of mind and consists of light. Lodged here deep within the heart, he is like a grain of rice or barley; he is the lord of all, the ruler of all! Over this whole world, over all there is, he rules. 

Those who know the truth of brahman-atman become "calm, composed, cool, patient, and collected" and are not affected by evil or doubt. The text also states that those who are without desire will go to Brahman after death:Now, a man who does not desire—who is without desires, who is freed from desires, whose desires are fulfilled, whose only desire is his self—-his vital functions (prana) do not depart. Brahman he is, and to brahman he goes.

Karma
One of the earliest formulation of the Karma doctrine occurs in the Bṛhadāraṇyaka which states:

Afterlife 
The text also contains some speculations about the afterlife. In one passage, Yajñavalkya is asked what happens to a man who has died and he states that after death "a man turns into something good by good action (karma) and into something bad by bad action." 

The Bṛhadāraṇyaka also describes how the atman leaves the body at death and takes up a new life. The text describes the process as follows:As a caterpillar, when it comes to the tip of a blade of grass, reaches out to a new foothold and draws itself onto it, so the self (atman), after it has knocked down this body and rendered it unconscious, reaches out to a new foothold and draws itself onto it.

Ethics
The Bṛhadāraṇyaka includes hymns on virtues and ethics. In verse 5.2.3, for example, it recommends three virtues: self-restraint (दमः, damah), charity (दानं, daanam), and compassion for all life (दया, daya).

These basic Vedic ethical principles found in the Bṛhadāraṇyaka later developed into the more complex yamas (ethical rules) found various schools of Hinduism.

Psychology
The verses in the Bṛhadāraṇyaka contain theories pertaining to psychology and human motivations. Verse 1.4.17 describes the desire for progeny as the desire to be born again. The Bṛhadāraṇyaka Upaniṣad states a behavioral theory, linking action to nature, suggesting that behavioral habits makes a man:

According as one acts, so does he become.
One becomes virtuous by virtuous action,
bad by bad action.
— Brihadaranyaka Upanishad 4.4.5

Ancient and medieval Indian scholars have referred to Bṛhadāraṇyaka Upaniṣad as a foundation to discuss psychological theories, the nature of psyche, and how body, mind and Self interact. For example, Adi Shankara in his commentary on the Bṛhadāraṇyaka explains the relation between consciousness, the mind and the body.

Mind creates desire, asserts Bṛhadāraṇyaka Upaniṣad, with its basis in pleasure. Eye is the cause of material wealth, because it is through sight that wealth is created states the Upanishad, while ears are spiritual wealth, because it is through listening that knowledge is shared. The Upanishad suggests in the dialogue between Yajnavalkya and Maitreyi, husband and wife, that one does not love an object for the sake of the object but for the sake of the subject, the Self (the Self of the other person).

Metaphysics
Verse 1.3.28 acknowledges that metaphysical statements in the Upanishads are meant to guide the reader from unreality to reality. The metaphysics of Bṛhadāraṇyaka Upaniṣad often presents a kind of non-dualism or monism. For instance, in verse 2.4.13 Yajñavalkya asserts that everything in the universe is the Self. Some passages state that Brahman is the whole:Clearly, this self is brahman—this self that is made of perception, made of mind, made of sight, made of breath, made of hearing, made of earth, made of water, made of wind, made of space, made of light and the lightless, made of desire and the desireless, made of anger and the angerless, made of the righteous and the unrighteous; this self that is made of everything.Upanishadic metaphysics is further elucidated in the Madhu-vidya (honey doctrine), where the essence of every object is described to be same to the essence of every other object. The Bṛhadāraṇyaka Upaniṣad looks at reality as being indescribable and its nature to be infinite and consciousness-bliss. The cosmic energy is thought to integrate in the microcosm and in the macrocosm as well as the individual and the universe.

Different interpretations

The Bṛhadāraṇyaka Upaniṣad has attracted secondary literature and commentaries (bhasya) from many scholars. In these secondary texts, the same passages have been interpreted in different ways by the various sub-schools of Vedanta such as nondualistic Advaita (monism), dualistic Dvaita (theism) and qualified nondualistic Vishistadvaita.

Popular mantras

Pavamāna Mantra

This is from the Brihadaranyaka Upanishad (1.3.28)

Translation:

Editions
Willem Caland, The  in the  Recension, rev. ed. by Raghu Vira, Lahore 1926, repr. Delhi (1983)
 Émile Senart, Brihad-Aranyaka Upanishad,  Belles Lettres (1967) 
TITUS online edition (based on both Weber and Caland)
 Sivananda Saraswati, The Brihadaranyaka Upanishad: Sanskrit text, English translation, and commentary. Published by Divine Life Society, 1985.

Translations
Robert Hume, Brihadaranyaka Upanishad, Oxford University Press
Max Müller, The Upanishads - includes Brihadaranyaka, The Sacred Books of the East - Volume 15, Oxford University Press
 
 Swami Madhavananda, Brihadaranyaka Upanishad
Brihadaranyaka Upanishad, Translations by Johnston, Nikhilānanda, Madhavananda
The Bṛhadāraṇyaka Upaniṣad (with the Commentary of Śaṅkarācārya) original Sanskrit and English translation

In literature
Poet T. S. Eliot makes use of the story "The Voice of the Thunder" and for the source of "datta, dayadhvam, and damyata found in the Brihadaranyaka Upanishad. Sections of the story appear in his poem The Waste Land under part V "What the Thunder Said".

References

External links

GRETIL etext
Bṛhadāraṇyaka Upaniṣad mp3 recordings of classes by Swami Tadatmananda, Arsha Bodha Center
Video/Audio classes, Reference texts, Discussions and other Study material on Brihadaranyaka Upanishad at Vedanta Hub

Upanishads